The La Kermesse Franco-Americaine Festival is a festival in Biddeford, Maine, which celebrates the state's French and French Canadian heritage. It is colloquially shortened to 'La Kermesse'. La Kermesse began in 1982 with the motto "C'est Le Temp".

History 
Established in 1982, La Kermesse has been a celebration of French Canadian culture in Maine with live music, games and entertainment. In 1997, the Festival shifted to include all groups in the city. Throughout its history the festival has used a green frog as it's mascot and pin-back buttons to confirm entry. These  buttons get changed every year and so people collect and trade them. Fireworks are also a prominent feature of the festival. After being postponed by COVID-19, La Kermesse returned in 2022.

Struggles 
In 2009 and 2010, the Festival faced significant financial difficulties and nearly shut down. After the festival survived these difficult times, the COVID-19 pandemic caused the festival to be postponed in 2020 and 2021.

References

Biddeford, Maine
1982 establishments in Maine
French-Canadian culture in Maine
Recurring events established in 1982